Bank roll can refer to one of these following concepts:
Coin wrapper
A level from the video game Duke Nukem 3D
It may also refer to:
 Bankroll Fresh (born 1987), American rapper from Atlanta, Georgia
 Bankroll Mafia, American hip hop collective from Atlanta, Georgia
 "Bankroll Mafia" (album), eponymously titled debut studio album
 "Bankroll.", a song by American DJ Diplo

See also
Payroll